The Zeta (Serbian Cyrillic: Зета) is a river in Montenegro. 

Its source is under the mountain of Vojnik. The river flows eastwards for  until it empties into the river Morača just north of Podgorica.

Geography
One theory is that the name "Zeta" derives from an early Greek "Zenta", later romanized in "Senta".

The Zeta River is the most significant tributary of the Morača river. The Perućica hydroelectric power plant near Nikšić (307 MW, 970 GWh) uses the waters of the Zeta River to generate power. After that, the river meanders through the Bjelopavlići Valley and Danilovgrad Municipality, until it empties into the Morača a few miles north of Capital City of Podgorica.

Historical monumental Carev Most (the Tsar's Bridge) exists over Zeta to the south of Nikšić town, and the ancient castle of Pandurica is situated nearby.

References

Rivers of Montenegro
Morača
Zeta (geographical region)